Łuków railway station is a railway station serving Łuków, Poland. It is served by Koleje Mazowieckie (which runs services from Łuków to Warszawa Zachodnia), Polregio (local and InterRegio services), PKP Intercity (TLK services) and some international trains.

It was opened in 1866.

References
Station article at kolej.one.pl

External links 
 

Railway stations in Poland opened in 1866
Railway stations in Lublin Voivodeship
Railway stations served by Koleje Mazowieckie
Railway station
1866 establishments in the Russian Empire